Izidor Penko (born 25 July 1996 in Ljubljana) is a Slovenian former professional cyclist, who rode professionally between 2015 and 2018, entirely for the  team.

Major results

2014
 1st Trofeo Emilio Paganessi
 National Junior Road Championships
2nd Road race
2nd Time trial
 6th Road race, UCI Junior Road World Championships
2016
 3rd Time trial, National Under-23 Road Championships
2017
 1st  Time trial, National Under-23 Road Championships
 3rd Time trial, National Road Championships
2018
 2nd  Time trial, UEC European Under-23 Road Championships
 3rd  Time trial, Mediterranean Games 
 3rd Time trial, National Road Championships

References

External links

1996 births
Living people
Slovenian male cyclists
Sportspeople from Ljubljana
Mediterranean Games bronze medalists for Slovenia
Mediterranean Games medalists in cycling
Competitors at the 2018 Mediterranean Games